Abe Jones may refer to:

Abe Jones (baseball), 1880s–1890s African-American baseball player
Abraham Jones (footballer) (1875–1942), English footballer (Middlesbrough, West Bromwich Albion, Luton Town), father of Abe Jones Jr
Abe Jones Jr. (1899 – after 1923), English footballer (Birmingham, Reading, Brighton & Hove Albion, Merthyr Town), son of Abraham Jones (footballer)
Abe Jones (politician), member of the North Carolina House of Representatives 
Abe Jones House on National Register of Historic Places listings in Oconee County, Georgia

See also
Abraham Jones (disambiguation)